The Federation of Law Societies of Canada is the national coordinating body of Canada's 14 law societies.

History 
The Conference of Governing Bodies of the Legal Profession in Canada, formed in 1926, was the precursor of the Federation. The Federation was incorporated in 1972 to coordinate policies of provincial and territorial law societies.

Reforms

In 2002, it formulated the National Mobility Agreement  which facilitated the practice of law across provincial jurisdictions. 

The Federation's Task Force on the Common Law Degree released its final report in 2009. The report recommended that law societies for Canada's common law jurisdictions (all provinces and territories except Quebec) adopt a national minimum requirement for those seeking to enter bar admission programs.  It proposed that law schools teach certain minimum competencies, a stand-alone ethics course, and possess certain institutional minimums. It would also affect the Federation's National Committee on Accreditation which permits the admittance of foreign educated students.

CanLII

The right of access to the law has been asserted through the Montreal Declaration. The Declaration was first promulgated in 2002 through the Legal Information Institutes of the world. In Canada, the National Virtual Law Library Group had presented a proposal for a free data base to the Federation of Law Societies of Canada in August 2000. Out of this initiative CanLII was created. CanLII is a non-profit organization that provides free access to legal information. It is funded by the Federation. The Board of Directors of CanLII reports to the Federation. CanLII's role is to address the interests of the provincial and territorial law societies as well as the needs of the legal profession and the general public for free access to law.

Member organizations
The FLSC is made up of 14 member organizations with one law society from each province and territory. The exception is Quebec which has two law societies, one for lawyers and one for civil law notaries.

References

External links
 

Organizations established in 1972
1972 establishments in Canada
Federations